USS LST-994 was an LST-542-class tank landing ship in the United States Navy. Like many of her class, she was not named and is properly referred to by her hull designation.

History 
LST-994 was laid down on 12 March 1944 at the Boston Navy Yard; launched on 17 April 1944; sponsored by Mrs. Lillian A. Finnerty; and commissioned on 17 May 1944.

During World War II, LST-994 was assigned to the European theater and participated in the invasion of southern France in August and September 1944. Following the war, she performed occupation duty in the Far East and saw service in China until mid-April 1946. She returned to the United States and was decommissioned on 31 July 1946 and struck from the Navy list on 28 August that same year. On 23 December 1947, the ship was sold to Pablo N. Ferrari & Co. and operated as Doña Flora in Argentina

Argentine service 
In Argentine Navy service, Doña Flora was redesignated BDT-7 (Buque Desembarco de Tanques), and was named ARA Cabo San Pablo.  She was retired in 1966.

LST-994 earned one battle star for World War II service.

References

Notes

Bibliography

External links 
  history.navy.mil: USS LST-994
  navsource.org: USS LST-994

LST-542-class tank landing ships
World War II amphibious warfare vessels of the United States
Ships built in Boston
1944 ships
LST-542-class tank landing ships of the Argentine Navy